The Walt Disney Company France, formerly Buena Vista International France, is one of The Walt Disney Company's international divisions and also European divisions. It is headquartered in Paris, Strasbourg, Île-de-France.

The Walt Disney Company France is in charge of all Disney's brands and productions in France. The company also owns and operates French versions of Disney television channel and the Disneynature film unit. The Walt Disney Company France also co-produces content with other French media companies.

History

Gaumont Buena Vista International

Gaumont and Buena Vista International formed Gaumont Buena Vista International, their joint venture French distribution company, in 1992. In  a Disney Channel is launched in France, also serving Luxembourg and Switzerland.

After the  purchase of Fox Family Worldwide, Disney also got a major ownership interest in Fox Kids Europe, which included Fox Kids in France. Fox Kids switched over to Jetix in August 2004.

Disney Channel +1, a timeshift channel, and a Playhouse Disney channel launched in 2002. As of 30 June 2004, BVPD and Gaumont dissolved their French distribution joint venture, Gaumont Buena Vista International.

Buena Vista International France
On 30 November 2008 at 8:30 PM, Disney Cinemagic HD debuted in France broadcasting on CANALSAT from 6am to 1am daily, making the channel the first "children and family HDTV channel in a French market".

Jean-Francois Camilleri, head of the company, had the company acquire March of the Penguins for the French market. Buena Vista International France also managed to obtain a 20% ownership stake in the French version of the film. However, Buena Vista Pictures Distribution's bid to distribute the film in the US ultimately failed. At the formation of the Disneynature film unit, Camilleri was placed in charge of the unit.

Walt Disney Company France
In 2011, Disney Channel HD was launched and Disney Junior replaced the Playhouse channels. In 2012, a Disneynature cable TV channel was launched in France. It is currently carried by France Telecom.

Camilleri resigned his posts with Disney France in March 2019. While Helene Etzi was appointed to take over his responsibility as head of Disney's French operations, there was no word on who would helm Disneynature.

Divisions
 Cinema
 Walt Disney Studios Motion Pictures France (former Buena Vista International France), distribution unit.
 Walt Disney Studios Home Entertainment France (former Buena Vista Home Entertainment France), video distribution unit.
 Disneynature, a film unit that produces documentary.

 Television
 Disney Channel, flagship channel.
 Disney Channel +1, a +1 time shift channel.
 Disney Junior, a channel aimed mainly at children 2–7 years old.

 Streaming service
 Disney Channel Pop Pick Play, a service dedicated to Disney Channel productions, include in some TV packages.
 Disney English, an educational service include in some TV packages.
 Holà Disney, an educational service include in some TV packages.

 Video on demand service
 Disneytek, a service dedicated to Disney, Marvel and Star Wars productions.
 ABCtek, a service dedicated to ABC Studios productions.
 Disneynature TV, a service dedicated to Disneynature productions.

Euro Disney S.A.S., Disney Store France and Disney+ are not part of The Walt Disney Company France.

Closed divisions
 Cinema and animation
 Walt Disney Animation France (former Brizzi Films), an animation studio launched in 1986 and closed in 2003.
 SIP Animation (49% minority stake)

 Press
 Disney Hachette Presse, a magazine publisher co-own with Hachette Filipacchi Médias, closed in 2019. All publications are now published by Unique Heritage Media as part of a licensing agreement with The Walt Disney Company France.

 Television
 Toon Disney and Toon Disney +1, a channel launched in 2002 and closed in 2007, replaced by Disney Cinemagic.
 Playhouse Disney, a preschool channel launched in 2002 and closed in 2011, replaced by Disney Junior.
 ESPN Classic Sport, a sport channel launched in 2002 and closed in 2013.
 Jetix, a channel launched in 2004 and closed in 2009, replaced by Disney XD.
 Disney Cinemagic and Disney Cinemagic +1, a cinema channel launched in 2007 and closed in 2015,

See also
 The Walt Disney Company Italy

References

External links
 

Companies based in Paris
Companies based in Strasbourg
France
Mass media companies of France
Television networks in France